Mahammad Kangarli - head of the Azerbaijan National Center immigrant, personal doctor of Mammad Amin Rasulzadeh. He has been a member of the Young Azer organization of the Musavat party since the age of 14. In 1939 he took part in the USSR-Finland war. Later, he was captured by the Germans in World War II and served as a military doctor in the Azerbaijani Legion.

Life and Activities 
Mahammad Kangarli was born on January 10, 1914, in Shusha. In 1928, at the age of 14, he became a member of the Young Azer organization of the Musavat party. After graduating from high school, he entered the Russian department of the Medical Faculty of the university in 1933, and then entered the Leningrad Military Academy, from which he graduated in 1939. After graduating from the academy, he served as a military doctor in the USSR-Finland war. Together with the medical battalion, he was captured by the Finns. A year later, when the prisoners were returned to the parties, Mahammad Bey was returned to the Soviet army.

In 1942 he was captured by the Germans in World War II. After his capture, he worked as a military doctor in the Azerbaijani Legion. Mahammad Kangarli, who lived in difficult conditions in Germany after World War II, came to Turkey in 1952 and worked at the Azerbaijan National Center in Ankara and the Azerbaijan Cultural Association. He married in 1954. From 1952 to 1979, he worked as a chief physician, head of health, assistant director general of the Red Crescent in various hospitals of the Turkish Ministry of Health and Social Welfare, and as a counselor at the Turkish Embassy in Bonn. In 1963, he went to Cyprus and established the Red Crescent Hospital there. In 1971, India was sent to the war zone on behalf of the Red Crescent during the Kashmir war between Pakistan. He was repeatedly awarded medals of honor for his work there. He later worked as the head of the Monuments Circle in Turkey. During his lifetime, the "Azerbaijan" magazine, published in Ankara, published a large number of his articles on the national struggle. He died on August 17, 2006, in Ankara.

See also 
 Azerbaijani Legion
 Mammad Amin Rasulzadeh

References

Soviet emigrants to Turkey
2006 deaths
1914 births